Alberto Ramos Sesma (March 25, 1909 – March 17, 1967) was a Mexican polo player. He competed in the 1936 Summer Olympics. Born in Zanatepec, Oaxaca, he was part of the Mexican polo team, which won the bronze medal. He played all three matches in the tournament.

External links
Alberto Ramos' profile at databaseOlympics
XI Juegos Olimpicos Berlin 1936 - Bronce | Equipo de Polo 
Biography of Alberto Ramos 

1909 births
1967 deaths
Mexican polo players
Olympic bronze medalists for Mexico
Olympic polo players of Mexico
Polo players at the 1936 Summer Olympics
Sportspeople from Oaxaca
Olympic medalists in polo
Medalists at the 1936 Summer Olympics